2011 Faroe Islands Premier League, also known as Vodafonedeildin for sponsorship reasons is the sixty-ninth season of top-tier football on the Faroe Islands. It began on 9 April 2011 and  ended on 22 October 2011. HB Tórshavn are the defending champions, having won their 21st league championship in the previous season.

Teams
FC Suðuroy and AB Argir were relegated to 1. deild after finishing 9th and 10th in the 2010 season. Suðuroy are relegated after just one season in the top flight while AB Argir go down after two seasons in the top flight.

They were replaced by 1. deild champions 07 Vestur and runners-up KÍ Klaksvík. Both make their return to the top flight after a one-year absence.

Team summaries

League table

Results
The schedule consisted of a total of 27 games. Each team played three games against every opponent in no particular order. At least one of the games was at home and one was away. The additional home game for every match-up was randomly assigned prior to the season with the top five teams of the previous season having 5 home games.

Regular home games

Additional home games

Top goalscorers
Including matches on 16 October; Source: Faroese FA

See also
 2011 Faroe Islands Cup

References

External links
 Official website 
 Faroe Islands soccer news, results and information
 Faroe Islands soccer news, results, statistics and information

Faroe Islands Premier League seasons
1
Faroe
Faroe